Russia participated in the Eurovision Song Contest 2003 in Riga, Latvia. The Russian entry was selected internally by the Russian broadcaster Channel One Russia (C1R). t.A.T.u. represented Russia with the song "Ne ver', ne boysia", which placed 3rd and scored 164 points at the contest.

Before Eurovision

Internal selection 
On 26 January 2003, C1R announced a submission period for interested artists and composers to submit their entries until 1 March 2003. The broadcaster received 500 submissions at the conclusion of the deadline, including entries from Avraam Russo, Kristina Orbakaitė, Plazma and Smash. The jury which have consisted of Konstantin Ernst (general manager of C1R), Aleksandr Fifeman (general producer of C1R), Yuriy Aksyuta (music director of C1R), Vladimir Matetsky (singer-songwriter and producer) and Dmitri Malikov (singer, composer and producer) listened to submitted entries and was set to choose song for Eurovision, however, they did not find "Anything suitable" among the submitted entries and decided to directly invite t.A.T.u to represent Russia. On 19 March 2003, C1R announced that they had internally selected t.A.T.u. to represent Russia in Riga with the song "Ne ver', ne boysia", composed by Valery Polienko and with lyrics by Mars Lasar.

Participants

At Eurovision
Russia performed 11th at the 2003 Contest, following Germany and preceding Spain. After the voting concluded, Russia scored 164 points and placed 3rd, one point behind 2nd placed Belgium and 3 points behind the winner, Turkey. This guaranteed Russia automatic qualification to the final of the 2004 Contest.

The voting spokesperson for Russia was Yana Churikova.

After the contest, Channel One Russia complained that Irish broadcaster RTÉ had used a back-up jury, and that it had cost them victory. A statement by Channel One said "Considering [the] insignificant difference in points between the first and third places, there are grounds to believe that the contest results could be much different for Russia." RTÉ responded by publishing the unused results of the Irish televote, which showed that had the jury not been used, Turkey would still have won and Russia would have finished in second place.

Voting

References

2003
Countries in the Eurovision Song Contest 2003
Eurovision
t.A.T.u.